Blanche M. Manning (December 12, 1934 – September 20, 2020) was a United States district judge of the United States District Court for the Northern District of Illinois.

Early life and education

Manning was born on December 12, 1934 in Chicago. She received a Bachelor of Education from Chicago Teachers College in 1961, a Juris Doctor from John Marshall Law School in 1967, a Master of Arts from Roosevelt University in 1972, and a Master of Laws from the University of Virginia School of Law in 1992.

Legal career

From 1968 to 1973, Manning served as an assistant attorney in the Cook County, Illinois State Attorney's Office. From 1973 to 1977, Manning worked as a supervisory trial attorney for the Equal Employment Opportunity Commission in Chicago. She was also a lecturer at Malcolm X College from 1970 to 1971.

In 1977, Manning began work as a corporate litigation attorney for Chicago-based United Airlines. A year later, Manning transitioned to the role of assistant United States attorney for the Northern District of Illinois, a role she held from 1978 to 1979. During that same time, Manning was an adjunct professor at the National Conference of Black Lawyers Community College of Law. In 1979, she started her judicial career as an associate circuit court judge in Cook County, where she served until 1986.

Manning was a lead circuit judge in the Illinois Cook Judicial Circuit Court from 1986 to 1987. In 1987 she was elected as a justice in the Illinois First District Appellate Court of the Illinois Appellate Court, becoming the first African-American female member of the court. From 1992 to 1994, Manning also worked as an adjunct professor at the DePaul University College of Law.

Federal judicial service

On May 5, 1994, President Bill Clinton nominated Manning to serve as a United States district judge of the United States District Court for the Northern District of Illinois to a seat vacated by Milton Shadur, who assumed senior status on June 25, 1992. Manning was confirmed by the Senate on August 9, 1994, and received her commission on August 10, 1994. On February 1, 2010, Manning assumed senior status. She died on September 20, 2020, aged 85.

Notable ruling

Manning is known for sentencing Mark Whitacre, a whistleblower in the Archer Daniels Midland lysine pricefixing case.

See also 
 List of African-American federal judges
 List of African-American jurists

References

External links 

1934 births
2020 deaths
20th-century American judges
20th-century American lawyers
20th-century American women judges
20th-century American women lawyers
21st-century American judges
21st-century American women judges
21st-century African-American women
African-American judges
African-American lawyers
Assistant United States Attorneys
Chicago State University alumni
DePaul University faculty
Illinois state court judges
John Marshall Law School (Chicago) alumni
Judges of the Illinois Appellate Court
Judges of the United States District Court for the Northern District of Illinois
Lawyers from Chicago
Roosevelt University alumni
United States district court judges appointed by Bill Clinton
University of Virginia School of Law alumni